Chiyo is a feminine Japanese given name. Notable people with the name include:

 Chiyo Aizawa, Japanese murderer of father who sexually abused her since childhood
 Chiyo Okumura, Japanese singer
 Fukuda Chiyo-ni (Kaga no Chiyo), a Japanese poet of the Edo period
 Chiyo Uno, Japanese author
 Chiyo Nakamura, Japanese writer
 Yamauchi Chiyo, Japanese noble lady from the Sengoku period
 Mochizuki Chiyo, Japanese kunoichi from the Sengoku period
 Chiyo Miyako, Japanese supercentenarian

Fictional characters 
 Chiyo, from the anime and manga series Naruto
 Chiyo Mihama, from the anime and manga series Azumanga Daioh
 Chiyo Shuuzenji, from Boku no Hero Academia
 Chiyo Sakura, from the anime and manga series Monthly Girls' Nozaki-kun
 Chiyo Tsukidate a character the Strawberry Panic! anime series.
 Sakamoto Chiyo/Nitta Sayuri, from Memoirs of a Geisha
 Chiyo Yumehara, from the anime and manga series The Disastrous Life of Saiki K.
 Chiyo Īn from the manga Kimi no koto ga Dai Dai Dai Dai Daisuki na 100-nin no Kanojo
 Chiyo Suzuki, from the multimedia franchise Yo-Kai Watch

See also
 Kawauchi (disambiguation)
 Sendai (disambiguation)

Japanese feminine given names